Rolf Meyer (12 November 1910 – 3 February 1963) was a German screenwriter, film producer and director.

Selected filmography

Screenwriter
 Victoria (1935)
 Augustus the Strong (1936)
 Escapade (1936)
 Uncle Bräsig (1936)
 The Divine Jetta (1937)
 A German Robinson Crusoe (1940)
 The Bath in the Barn (1943)
 Young Hearts (1944)
  (1947)
 I'll Never Forget That Night (1949)
 Verlobte Leute (1950)
 Queen of the Arena (1952)
 The Bath in the Barn (1956)

Producer
 Paths in Twilight (1948)
 The Prisoner (1949)
 This Man Belongs to Me (1950)
 Melody of Fate (1950)
 Taxi-Kitty (1950)
 The Lie (1950)
 Miracles Still Happen (1951)
 Sensation in San Remo (1951)
 The Csardas Princess (1951)
 The Sinner (1951)

Director
  (1947)
 Menschen in Gottes Hand (1948)
 Gaspary's Sons (1948)
 The Beautiful Galatea (1950)
 Professor Nachtfalter (1951)
 Queen of the Arena (1952)

Bibliography
 Fehrenbach, Heide. Cinema in Democratizing Germany: Reconstructing National Identity After Hitler. University of North Carolina Press, 1995.

External links

1910 births
1963 deaths
People from Quedlinburg
People from the Province of Saxony
Film people from Saxony-Anhalt